La Tuerka is a Spanish television show, produced by Producciones CMI, broadcast by Público TV over the Internet and by Tele K via TDT, with Pablo Iglesias Turrión as one of the presenters. The program airs on Mondays and Fridays at 10:00 pm on its YouTube channel, which has amassed almost 30 million views.

History

Fifth Season
The fifth season of La Tuerka introduced several changes to the program's format. Since then, it has consisted of several different shows:

Otra vuelta de Tuerka: Airs every Monday, presented by Pablo Iglesias. It consists of a face to face interview with diverse personalities. The interviewees have included, among others, Jesús Cintora, politician and lawyer Cristina Almeida, and former basketball player Fernando Romay.

La Tuerka Distrito Federal: A program for research, reporting and discussion presented by Noelia Vera and Tania Sánche, which airs on Tuesdays.

La Tuerka News: An informative and humorous program presented by Facu Díaz y Héctor Juanatey, which airs on Wednesdays.

En Clave Tuerka: A conversation with several guests presented by Juan Carlos Monedero, which airs on Thursdays.

Tuerka Sound: Music videos.

El Tornillo: A feminist video blog.

In October 2014, the program was awarded a prize for journalism at the Premios Enfocados de Periodismo 2014.

References

External links

Official YouTube channel of the program

2010s Spanish television series
2010 Spanish television series debuts